Ross Marc Starr (born 1945) is an American economist who specializes in microeconomic theory, monetary economics and mathematical economics. He is a professor at the University of California, San Diego.

Starr grew up in Los Angeles where he attended high school. He attended UCLA and Reed College before obtaining his Bachelor of Science degree in mathematics from Stanford in 1966. He completed his PhD in economics at Stanford in 1972. His dissertation was supervised by Kenneth Arrow.

He has worked at the RAND corporation, Yale, UC Davis, UC Berkeley, the Federal Reserve Bank in San Francisco and at UC San Diego.

Starr first published the Shapley–Folkman lemma on the existence of quasi-equilibria in economies with non-convexities.

In addition to publications in economic journals, he wrote the textbook General Equilibrium Theory: An Introduction.

Selected publications

References

External links

General equilibrium theorists
Monetary economists
Mathematical economists
Economists from California
University of California, Davis faculty
University of California, San Diego faculty
Yale University faculty
RAND Corporation people
University of California, Los Angeles alumni
Reed College alumni
1945 births
Living people
21st-century American economists